Jang Jung-won (born August 2, 1994) is a former South Korean football player.

Career
Jang Jung-won joined J2 League club Avispa Fukuoka in 2013. On September 7, he debuted in Emperor's Cup (v Tochigi SC). In March 2014, he moved to Renofa Yamaguchi FC.

References

External links

1994 births
Living people
South Korean footballers
J2 League players
Japan Football League players
Avispa Fukuoka players
Renofa Yamaguchi FC players
Association football midfielders